Ahmad Khaleghi Damghani (born 1958) is an Iranian political scientist and author. He holds PhD in Political Science (Political Thoughts), from the University of Tehran. His interests and researches focused on contemporary Western Political Philosophy, Continental philosophy and Iranian Contemporary Politics. He is an associate professor at the Department of Political Science at Faculty of Law and Political Science at University of Tehran, Tehran, Iran.

Selected publications 
 Power, Language and Ordinary Life in Contemporary Political-Philosophical Discourse (Gam-e No, 2003).
 Political forces and the National Movement (Gam-e No, 2005).
 Lectures On "Being and Time" (Game-No, 2006).
 Globalization of Capital (Gam-e No, 2006).

References

External Links
 International Political Economy Studies, Journal Reviewers 2020
 Ahmad Khaleghi Damghani's List of Published Journal Articles
 Author: Ahmad Khaleghi Damghani, Noormags 

Iranian political scientists
Iranian writers
Iranian activists
Academic staff of the University of Tehran
Living people
1958 births